Yamata Amasung Keibu Keioiba is a Meitei language play, written and directed by Heisnam Tomba. It was produced by the Kalakshetra Manipur. This play attempts to weave together the folktales of the two legendary creatures, Yamata-no-Orochi of Japan and Keibu Keioiba of Manipur.

Background 
Yamata-no-Orochi was a Japanese dragon having 8 heads and 8 tails. Its body was enormous. Its body was as large as 8 valleys and 8 hills. Yamata was about to ate beautiful Kushinada. Yamata had already eaten 7 of her older sisters. But God Susanoo killed Yamata and saved her. Keibu Keioiba was a mythical creature with the head of tiger and the body of human. He once kidnapped lonely Lady Thabaton. Later, Thabaton's seven older brothers killed Keibu Keioiba and saved her. It happened with the help of a wise old woman.

The play shows the qualities of sacrifices and great sufferings through the mythologies of Japan and Manipur. They are interwoven in such a way that the stories of the two hilltops could be narrated together.

According to Heisnam Tomba, the director of the play, the play attempts to capture the two different cultures and explore every possible interpretations. The play was an intercultural testing of stories, dance, music and performing traditional arts. It shows the modern day meaning of the rich folklore of both Japanese culture and Meitei culture.

Casts 
 Yamata-no-Orochi played by Maisnam Momocha
 1st Keibu Keioiba	played by Kshetrimayum Priyobrata  
 2nd Keibu Keioiba	played by Pangambam Tyson Meitei
 Susanoo played by  Romario Thoudam Paona
 Iben Hanubi (Old Grandmother) played by Kh. Sanjukta 
 Mapa (Father) played by Ahanthem Upendro Mangang
 Mama (Mother) played by Huidrom Holina
 Kushinada played by Roslin Akoijam Chanu
 Thaba played by Thangjam Salini 
 Mithingai played by Guru Koken

See also 
 Keibu Keioiba (Tiger Head)

References

External links 
 
 
 
 

Japanese-Meitei culture
Japanese mythology
Keibu Keioiba
Meitei cultural plays
Meitei folklore in popular culture
Meitei language plays
Meitei mythology
Meitei mythology in popular culture